The 1999 season was the Atlanta Falcons' 34th in the National Football League (NFL). They finished with a 5–11 record, some way short of the 14–2 record they managed in the previous season, and failed to reach the playoffs, which meant they would not be the first team to play in the Super Bowl at their own stadium. The Falcons and their Super Bowl XXXIII opponents, the Denver Broncos, managed an aggregate 11–21 record between them; it was the worst combined record by two teams the year after they reached the Super Bowl until the Oakland Raiders and the Tampa Bay Buccaneers in 2003.

The season saw star running back Jamal Anderson hurt his knee in Week 2 and be subsequently placed on injured reserve, ending his season and any hope of the Falcons matching their 1998 form. The injury that Anderson suffered was career-threatening.

Offseason

Free agents

NFL draft

Personnel

Staff

Roster

Schedule

Standings

References

External links 
 1999 Atlanta Falcons at Pro-Football-Reference.com

Atlanta Falcons seasons
Atlanta Falcons
Atlanta